Founded in March 2003, Gravity Interactive LLC was created to host games for North America developed by GRAVITY Co., Ltd. It is based in Buena Park near Orange County, California. Gravity was initially provided with several servers from Gravity Co., and began beta testing of the International Ragnarok Online (iRO) service in 2003. Commercial service subsequently began on June 1, 2003. In 2005, Gravity also began hosting the North American version of ROSE Online (naROSE). On January 1, 2006, Gravity Interactive LLC became Gravity Interactive, Inc. In February 2008, Gravity began beta testing its third MMORPG, Requiem: Bloodymare. Around mid to late 2012 Gravity began beta testing its fourth MMORPG, Maestia: Rise Of Keledus. In April 2013, Gravity began beta testing the second title in the Ragnarok Online series. Ragnarok Online 2 was launched in May 2013 and also available on Steam.

PC Games 
Games which Gravity Interactive currently offers include:

 Ragnarok Online
 Requiem: Rise of the Reaver (developed in-house)
 Dragon Saga (previously known as Dragonica, Developed in-house)
 Ragnarok Online 2
 Various other Ragnarok Online games

Games which Gravity Interactive previously offered include:
 ROSE Online (developed in-house)
 Eternal Destiny
 CrimeCraft
 FreeStyle Street Basketball
 Maestia: Rise Of Keledus
 Metal Assault

Mobile Games 
Games which Gravity Interactive currently offers include:
 Ragnarok Online: Valkyrie Uprising (Mobile)
 Ice Penguin (Mobile)
 Tower of Ascension (Mobile)
 Ragnarok: Ash Vacuum (Mobile)

L5 Games 
In 2007, Gravity founded a new game developer, L5 Games.  Its employees consisted of those formerly employed by Blizzard Entertainment.  This subsidiary of Gravity Interactive, rather than GRAVITY Co., Ltd., was formed to develop games for the North American market.  L5 Games went into liquidation in August 2008.

References

External links 
 International Ragnarok Online Homepage
 North American ROSE Online Homepage
 Global Requiem: Rise of the Reaver Homepage
 North American Dragon Saga Homepage
 North American Maestia: Rise Of Keledus Homepage
 North American Ragnarok Online 2 Homepage
 Mobile Ragnarok Online: Valkyrie Uprising Homepage
 Mobile Ice Penguin Homepage
 Mobile Tower of Ascension Homepage
 Mobile Ragnarok: Ash Vacuum Homepage

GungHo Online Entertainment
Video game companies of the United States
Video game publishers
Companies based in Los Angeles County, California
Companies established in 2003